Dragoș Ionuț Huiban (born 29 January 1990) is a Romanian professional footballer who plays as a midfielder of forward for Metaloglobus București.

Honours
Steaua București
Liga III: 2020–21

References

External links

 
 

1990 births
Living people
Sportspeople from Bacău
Romanian footballers
Association football midfielders
Association football forwards
Liga I players
Liga II players
FCM Bacău players
LPS HD Clinceni players
ASA 2013 Târgu Mureș players
Sepsi OSK Sfântu Gheorghe players
CS Sportul Snagov players
FC Gloria Buzău players
CSA Steaua București footballers
FC Metaloglobus București players